Charles Gray Catto (7 November 1896 – 24 June 1972) was an American pursuit pilot and a flying ace in World War I.

He died in Waco, Texas on 24 June 1972.

Biography
A son of British immigrants, Catto was born in Dallas, Texas in November 1896. Prior to World War I, he attended the University of Edinburgh, Scotland as a medical student. He wanted to enlist after the war broke out, but his parents refused. They told him he could only continue his studies if he promised not to join the army. He agreed to this and later, in June 1917, joined the Royal Flying Corps instead. He completed his flight training in England and left for Italy to join 45 Squadron, flying Sopwith Camels. He claimed six enemy aircraft, one of which fell inside Allied lines, piloted by Flieger Alois Gnamusch and Leutnant Rudolph Hess. He served with 45 Squadron when it was transferred to the Western Front in late 1918. He was credited with eight aerial victories.

After the war, Catto continued his medical studies at the University of Edinburgh and graduated in 1922. He returned to the United States and served his medical internship in New Orleans. In 1925, he became a doctor in his native Texas. He later entered politics was elected mayor of Waco, Texas on 20 April 1937.

See also

 List of World War I flying aces from the United States

References

1896 births
1972 deaths
People from Dallas
American World War I flying aces
Alumni of the University of Edinburgh
Mayors of Waco, Texas
American expatriates in Scotland